Lorenzo Bernardi (born 11 August 1968) is an Italian professional volleyball coach and former player, a silver medallist at the Olympic Games Atlanta 1996, two–time World Champion (1990, 1994), and a two–time European Champion (1989, 1995).

Bernardi was elected best player of the 1994 World Championship and 1995 European Championship, and in 2001, the FIVB declared him to be the "Volleyball Player of the Century" with Karch Kiraly.

Career
Born in Trento, Bernardi started his long career in the 1980s as setter, but later was switched to hitter and passer. From 1985 he played with the Panini Modena club. Bernardi won the Italian championship nine times with Modena and with Sisley Treviso, which he played for from 1990 to 2001.

His first cap with Italy national volleyball team was on 27 May 1987, he played for a total of 306 times in "Azzurri" colours, winning two European gold medals in (1989 and 1995), two World Championships (1990 and 1994), three Volleyball World Leagues and the Volleyball World Cup in 1995. His international tally also includes two more gold medals, five silver medals and one bronze.
Lorenzo was named the most valuable player of the 1992 FIVB World League after the Italians won the event for the third time in a row.
Lorenzo was named the Best Player of the 1994 FIVB World Championship after Italy captured the gold medal for the second consecutive time. During Bernardi's final Olympic Games appearance in 1996 in Atlanta, Italy won all five of its Pool B matches in straight sets. Italy continued its success with a four-set victory over Argentina in the quarterfinals, followed by a four-set semifinal victory over Serbia and Montenegro to reach its first-ever Olympic gold-medal match. However, Netherlands battled to a five-set victory leaving Italy with the silver medal.
Lorenzo was named the Best Player of the 1994 FIVB World Championship after Italy captured the gold medal for the second consecutive time.
In 2004, he played some competitions in Qatar and after a spell in Greece and Olympiacos, he has returned to play in Italy as of November 2005. In spite of his late age of 37, he was declared MVP of the first match in his new Italian club career. In his later career he played for a B1 series (Italy's third category) near his native Trento, finishing his playing career with Montichiari in 2007. Overall, Bernardi competed 306 times for Italy in international competition.
Lorenzo was part of nine Italian League championship teams to cement his legendary status in his home country.
During the 2010/2011 season, he took over the head coach position of the Polish club Jastrzębski Węgiel, and was able to reach the 4th spot in the CEV Champions League.
Bernardi in 2014 was named new coach of the Halkbank Ankara. In November 2016, he replaced Slobodan Kovač as coach of Sir Safety Perugia.

Style played
Lorenzo Bernardi’s versatility became a superior attribute to the sport that become a multi-talented hitter, outstanding passer and one of the ultimate all-around players of his generation.

Honours

As a player
 CEV European Champions Cup
  1989/1990 – with Modena Volley
  1994/1995 – with Sisley Treviso
  1998/1999 – with Sisley Treviso
  1999/2000 – with Sisley Treviso
 CEV Cup
  1985/1986 – with Modena Volley
  1993/1994 – with Sisley Treviso
 CEV Challenge Cup
  1990/1991 – with Sisley Treviso
  1992/1993 – with Sisley Treviso
  1997/1998 – with Sisley Treviso
  2004/2005 – with Lube Banca Macerata
 National championships
 1985/1986  Italian Cup, with Modena Volley
 1985/1986  Italian Championship, with Modena Volley
 1986/1987  Italian Championship, with Modena Volley
 1987/1988  Italian Cup, with Modena Volley
 1987/1988  Italian Championship, with Modena Volley
 1988/1989  Italian Cup, with Modena Volley
 1988/1989  Italian Championship, with Modena Volley
 1992/1993  Italian Cup, with Sisley Treviso
 1993/1994  Italian Championship, with Sisley Treviso
 1995/1996  Italian Championship, with Sisley Treviso
 1997/1998  Italian Championship, with Sisley Treviso
 1998/1999  Italian SuperCup, with Sisley Treviso
 1999/2000  Italian SuperCup, with Sisley Treviso
 1999/2000  Italian Cup, with Sisley Treviso
 1999/2000  Italian Championship, with Sisley Treviso
 2000/2001  Italian Championship, with Sisley Treviso
 2001/2002  Italian SuperCup, with Sisley Treviso

As a coach
 National championships
 2014/2015  Turkish SuperCup, with Halkbank Ankara
 2014/2015  Turkish Cup, with Halkbank Ankara
 2015/2016  Turkish SuperCup, with Halkbank Ankara
 2015/2016  Turkish Championship, with Halkbank Ankara
 2017/2018  Italian SuperCup, with Sir Safety Perugia
 2017/2018  Italian Cup, with Sir Safety Perugia
 2017/2018  Italian Championship, with Sir Safety Perugia
 2018/2019  Italian Cup, with Sir Safety Perugia

Individual awards
 1992: FIVB World League – Most Valuable Player
 1992: FIVB Club World Championship – Most Valuable Player
 1994: FIVB World Championship – Most Valuable Player
 1996: FIVB World League – Most Valuable Player
 1996: FIVB World League – Best Scorer

State awards
 2000:  Knight of the Order of Merit of the Italian Republic

References

External links
 
 
 
 Coach profile at LegaVolley.it 
 Coach/Player profile at Volleybox.net

1968 births
Living people
Sportspeople from Trento
Italian men's volleyball players
Italian volleyball coaches
Olympic volleyball players of Italy
Olympic medalists in volleyball
Olympic silver medalists for Italy
Volleyball players at the 1988 Summer Olympics
Volleyball players at the 1992 Summer Olympics
Volleyball players at the 1996 Summer Olympics
Medalists at the 1996 Summer Olympics
Modena Volley players
Trentino Volley players
Volley Lube players
Olympiacos S.C. players
Blu Volley Verona players
Jastrzębski Węgiel coaches